Eloria diaphana is a moth of the subfamily Lymantriinae first described by Stoll in 1781. It is found in Suriname.

References

Moths described in 1781
Lymantriinae